The 1994 European Men's Handball Championship was the inaugural edition of the tournament, held in Portugal from 3 to 12 June 1994, in the cities of Porto and Almada. Sweden won the tournament after defeating Russia in the final, while Croatia finished third.

Teams

Venues

Preliminary round 
All times are local (UTC+1).

Group A

Group B

Placement games

Eleventh place game

Ninth place game

Seventh place game

Fifth place game

Knockout stage

Bracket

Semifinals

Third place game

Final

Ranking and statistics

Final ranking

Top player awards 
 Most Valuable Player: 
 Top Scorer : , 50 goals

All Star Team 
 Goalkeeper: 
 Right wing: 
 Right back: 
 Centre back: 
 Left back: 
 Left wing: 
 Pivot: 

Source: .

References 
 
 

H
European Men's Handball Championship
Handball Championship
International handball competitions hosted by Portugal
June 1994 sports events in Europe
Sport in Almada
Sports competitions in Porto
20th century in Porto